James Patrick Lannon (October 12, 1878 – March 13, 1953) was born in Alexandria, Virginia. He graduated from the United States Naval Academy in 1902.

He received the Medal of Honor for actions at the United States occupation of Veracruz, 1914. He is buried at Arlington National Cemetery.

Medal of Honor citation

Lannon was awarded the Medal of Honor in 1915.

Citation:
"For extraordinary heroism in battle, engagement of Vera Cruz, 22 April 1914. Lt. Lannon assisted a wounded man under heavy fire, and after returning to his battalion was himself desperately wounded."

See also

List of Medal of Honor recipients (Veracruz)
List of United States Naval Academy alumni (Medal of Honor)

References

External links

1878 births
1953 deaths
United States Navy Medal of Honor recipients
United States Naval Academy alumni
United States Navy admirals
United States Navy personnel of World War I
United States Navy World War II admirals
Recipients of the Navy Cross (United States)
Burials at Arlington National Cemetery
Battle of Veracruz (1914) recipients of the Medal of Honor